Shin's Tricycle is a children's book by , first published in Japanese in 1992 as  and in its English translation in 1995.

Synopsis

Kodama, himself a survivor of the bombing of Hiroshima, narrates the story from the point of view of Shin's father, . Shinichi is playing on his tricycle when the bomb is detonated. Nobuo finds the barely alive Shin still holding onto the tricycle's handlebars and trapped under the rubble of their destroyed home. Nobuo's efforts to save his son are in vain and Shin dies that evening. Nobuo buries Shin with his tricycle.

Forty years later, Nobuo exhumes Shin and his two sisters, who also died in the bombing, in order to give them a proper burial at a cemetery. While digging everything up, a pipe was found, believed to be a part of the tricycle Shinichi had owned. Not long after, they found skeletal remains of two human hands; the remains were identified as Shinichi and his local friend, Kimiko, who had died together with him, holding his hand. Nobuo donated the tricycle to the Hiroshima Peace Museum, where it is currently on display.

Reception

On publication, the author's refusal to cushion the horror of the story of Shin's Tricycle was noted by several reviewers, some stating that the book's graphic content was inappropriate for its intended readers (aged 7 to 10). The book has subsequently been praised for its powerful treatment of the subject matter.

References

External links
 Shinichi Tetsutani's tricycle on display at Hiroshima Peace Museum 

Japanese children's literature
Japanese picture books
Books about the atomic bombings of Hiroshima and Nagasaki
1992 children's books